Evert Reinhold Emanuel "Västervik" Nilsson (22 October 1894 – 14 February 1973) was a Swedish pentathlete and decathlete who competed at the 1920 and 1924 Summer Olympics. In 1920 he finished fifth in the decathlon; in the pentathlon he placed tenth, despite not running the 1500 m stage. Four years later he withdrew from the decathlon and pentathlon competitions after the fourth contest. Nilsson was Swedish champion in the pentathlon (1921–23) and decathlon (1920, 1923, 1925 and 1926) and held national records in both events.

References

1894 births
1973 deaths
Swedish decathletes
Swedish pentathletes
Olympic athletes of Sweden
Athletes (track and field) at the 1920 Summer Olympics
Athletes (track and field) at the 1924 Summer Olympics
Olympic decathletes